Dwarf cornel may refer to the following plants:

Canadian dwarf cornel, Cornus canadensis
Eurasian dwarf cornel, Cornus suecica